Himalaiella is a genus of flowering plants belonging to the family Asteraceae.

Its native range is Iran to China and Indo-China, Taiwan.

Species:

Himalaiella abnormis 
Himalaiella afghana 
Himalaiella albescens 
Himalaiella andersonii 
Himalaiella auriculata 
Himalaiella chenopodiifolia 
Himalaiella chitralica 
Himalaiella deltoidea 
Himalaiella foliosa 
Himalaiella heteromalla 
Himalaiella hohuanshanense 
Himalaiella lushaiensis 
Himalaiella natmataungensis 
Himalaiella nivea 
Himalaiella peguensis 
Himalaiella qinghaiensis 
Himalaiella yakla

References

Asteraceae
Asteraceae genera